KPNP (1600 AM) was a radio station broadcasting a World Ethnic format. Licensed to Watertown, Minnesota, the station was last owned by Self Retire, Inc. KPNP's studios were located on Brooklyn Boulevard in Minneapolis, while its transmitter was located near Minnetrista.

History
The station went on the air as KWOM on July 5, 1989. On April 12, 2004, the station changed its call sign to KZGX, then to the final KPNP on September 12, 2007. KPNP once broadcast using the CAM-D system. Its license was cancelled on April 2, 2021, as its owners did not renew the station's license.

References

Radio stations in Minnesota
Radio stations established in 1989
1989 establishments in Minnesota
Defunct radio stations in the United States
Radio stations disestablished in 2021
2021 disestablishments in Minnesota
Defunct mass media in Minnesota